Bradyrhizobium elkanii is a species of legume-root nodulating, microsymbiotic nitrogen-fixing bacterium originally identified as DNA homology group II strains of B. japonicum . In 1988, it was discovered that only DNA homology group II strains caused a destructive bleaching of leaves, termed scientifically "microsymbiont-induced foliar chlorosis", which was widespread in soybean production fields of the southern United States . Whole cell fatty acid content together with antibiotic resistance profiles were major phenotypic differences that helped establish DNA homology group II strains as a new species, Bradyrhizobium elkanii .

References

External links
Type strain of Bradyrhizobium elkanii at BacDive -  the Bacterial Diversity Metadatabase

Nitrobacteraceae
Bacteria described in 1993